Kosintsev is a Russian masculine surname, its feminine counterpart is Kosintseva. It may refer to
Nadezhda Kosintseva (born 1985), Russian chess player
Tatiana Kosintseva (born 1986), Russian chess player, sister of Nadezhda

Russian-language surnames